The Novator is a light armored vehicle, designed by the Ukrainian Armor company of Ukraine. Сreated for patrolling in mountainous terrain, ending public disorder, conducting special operations for the elimination of massive disturbances, the search and detention of criminals who constitute a public danger, the transportation of wounded and for people taken into custody.

Technical description
The light armoured vehicle has a maximum road speed of 140 km/h. It has the ability to traverse long distances, which makes it ideal for border patrol. The Novator performs fast maneuvers under difficult conditions due to the ideal distribution of the load on the axle.

The vehicle seems to be protected against small arms and shell splinters, including a 7.62×54mmR fired from a Dragunov sniper rifle at 10 meters.

The design of the vehicle is divided in three main parts with the engine at the front, crew and troop compartment in the middle and cargo area at the rear. It can accommodate five military personnel with two seats at the front and three at the rear.

The Varta Novator has a length of 5.80 m, a width of 2.405 m and a height of 2.164 m. It has a gross weight of 9,000 kg and a payload capacity of up to 1,000 kg. The vehicle has a 300 hp, 6.7 litre turbo diesel engine. The Varta Novator has a maximum road speed of 140 km/h. It has a maximum cruising range of 700 km.

Operators
 
 Ukrainian Armed Forces - 40

 
 Kadyrovites - captured from the Ukrainian army

Gallery

References

External links

 

Armoured fighting vehicles of Ukraine
Military vehicles introduced in the 2010s